Cayuga (Bruce Field) Aerodrome  is  east of Cayuga, Ontario, Canada.

References

Registered aerodromes in Ontario